Sridhar Ramaswamy (born 1967) is an American computer scientist. He is the cofounder and CEO of the startup company Neeva, an ad-free, privacy-focused search engine. He previously led Google’s $115 billion advertising division.

Early life and education
Ramaswamy was born in 1967 in Tamil Nadu, India. He attended IIT Madras and received a bachelor's degree in computer science. He immigrated to the United States in 1989 and received a master's degree and PhD in computer science from Brown University.

Career
After graduating from college, Ramaswamy researched database analytics for three years at Bell Labs and held similar positions at Lucent Technologies and Bell Communications Research. While working for E.piphany as a machine learning systems developer, Google began recruiting engineers from the company.

Ramaswany joined Google in 2003 to work on the back-end infrastructure of AdWords as a mid-level engineer. He worked his way up the company over the course of 15 years. In 2013, he was promoted to senior vice president of advertising and commerce at Google.

Ramaswamy left Google in 2018 to become a partner at venture capitalist firm Greylock Partners. In 2019, he created Neeva as an alternative to Google Search, after becoming disillusioned with the limitations of the ad-supported search model. Instead of ads, Ramaswamy planned a subscription-based model for Neeva. Neeva was launched in the US in 2021 and the next year in the UK, France, and Germany.

Personal life
Ramaswamy lives in Cupertino, California, with his wife and two sons.

References

External links

Brown University alumni
Google employees
1967 births
Living people
American computer scientists
IIT Madras alumni
Businesspeople from Tamil Nadu
Indian emigrants to the United States
American people of Tamil descent